Dataiku is an artificial intelligence (AI) and machine learning company which was founded in 2013. In December 2019, Dataiku announced that CapitalG—the late-stage growth venture capital fund financed by Alphabet Inc.—joined Dataiku as an investor and that it had achieved unicorn status. As of 2021, Dataiku is valued at $4.6 billion. Dataiku currently employs more than  people worldwide between offices in New York, Denver, Washington DC, Los Angeles, Paris, London, Munich, Frankfurt, Sydney, Singapore, Tokyo, and Dubai.

History 
Dataiku was founded in Paris in 2013 by Florian Douetteau, Clément Stenac, Thomas Cabrol and Marc Batty. In 2015, Dataiku established itself in the United States in New York City.

In January 2015, Dataiku raised $3.6 million from Serena Capital and Alven Capital, two French technology venture capital funds. This was followed by $14 million raised with FirstMark Capital, a New York City-based venture capital firm in October 2016. 

In September 2017 the company raised a $28 million Series B investment from Battery Ventures, as well as historic investors. 

In December 2018, Dataiku announced a $101 million Series C funding round led by ICONIQ Capital. Other investors included Alven Capital, Battery Ventures, Dawn Capital and FirstMark Capital. In September 2019, the company was included in the Forbes Cloud 100, a ranking of the top 100 private cloud companies in the world. 

In December 2019, one day after releasing Dataiku 6, Dataiku announced that CapitalG—the late-stage growth venture capital fund financed by Alphabet Inc.—purchased some of the shares previously owned by Serena Capital in a secondary round that valued Dataiku at $1.4 billion, making it a unicorn. 

In August 2020, Dataiku announced an additional $100 million Series D funding round led by Stripes and Tiger Global Management, and participation from existing investors including Battery Ventures, CapitalG, Dawn Capital, FirstMark Capital, and ICONIQ. The company did not disclose its new valuation, but said that it was "still a unicorn".

In August 2021, Dataiku announced another $400 million raise Series E by Tiger Global Management, bringing its total valuation to $4.6 billion.

In December 2022, Dataiku announced a $200 million Series F led by new investor Wellington Management.

Products 
The Dataiku software: Dataiku Data Science Studio (Dataiku DSS) was announced in 2014, it supports predictive modelling to build business applications. Later versions of Dataiku also include other features.

Dataiku offers a free edition and enterprise versions with additional features, such as multi-user collaboration or real-time scoring.

In June 2021, Dataiku released Dataiku Online, a fully new managed version of Dataiku. This new product targets smaller companies such as high-growth startups.

References

External links 
 

Big data companies
Data analysis software
Privately held companies based in New York City
American companies established in 2013
French companies established in 2013
2013 establishments in France
Proprietary software